The 10th AVN Awards ceremony, presented by Adult Video News (AVN), honored pornographic films released in 1992 in the United States and took place in January 1993, at Bally's Hotel and Casino in Paradise, Nevada. During the ceremony, AVN presented AVN Awards in 67 categories. The ceremony was produced by Gary Miller and directed by S. Marco DiMercurio. Actor Randy West hosted the show for the second consecutive year, with actresses Porsche Lynn and Ona Zee as co-hosts.

The Party won eight AVN awards but Best Film went to Face Dance, Parts 1 & 2, which also won Best Director—Film for John Stagliano.

Winners and nominees 

The winners were announced during the awards ceremony in January 1993. Ashlyn Gere won the grand slam of erotic acting: Female Performer of the Year, Best Actress in a Feature Film and Best Actress in a Video.

Major awards 

Winners are listed first, highlighted in boldface, and indicated with a double dagger.

Additional award winners 

These awards were also announced at the awards show.

 Best All-Girl Video: Kittens III
 Best All-Sex Video: Realities 2
 Best Alternative Release, Film: Desert Passion
 Best Alternative Release, Specialty or Featurette Tape: Playmates In Paradise
 Best Alternative Release, Video: Love Scenes, Vol. 2
 Best Amateur Tape: Amorous Amateurs #12
 Best Anal-Themed Video: Dr. Butts 2
 Best Art Direction: Bonnie and Clyde
 Best Big-Bust Specialty Tape: Adventures of Breastman
 Best Bisexual Video: Down Bi Law
 Best Bondage Specialty Tape: Ona Zee's Learning The Ropes 1–3
 Best Boxcover Concept: Bonnie and Clyde
 Best Boxcover Concept, Gay Video: Mindscape II
 Best Cinematography: Face Dance, Parts 1 & 2
 Best Compilation Tape: Only The Very Best On Film
 Best Director, Bisexual Video: Josh Eliot, Down Bi Law
 Best Director, Feature Film: John Stagliano, Face Dance, Parts 1 & 2
 Best Director, Gay Video: Chi Chi LaRue, Songs in the Key of Sex
 Best Director, Video Feature (tie): Alex de Renzy, Two Women; Anthony Spinelli, The Party
 Best Editing for a Film: Chameleons
 Best Editing for a Gay Video Feature: James Stark, Kiss-Off
 Best Gay Video Feature: Kiss-Off
 Best Gay Video Solo Release: The Beat Cop

 Best Music: Chameleons
 Best Music, Gay Video: Straight To The Zone
 Best Newcomer, Gay Video: B. J. Slater
 Best Non-Sexual Performance: J. B., The Dirty Little Mind of Martin Fink
 Best Non-Sexual Performance, Gay Video: Kenneth Weyerhaeuser, Kiss-Off
 Best Overall Marketing Campaign: The Party, Pepper Productions
 Best Packaging, Feature Film: Sin City—The Movie
 Best Packaging, Gay Video: Mindscape II
 Best Packaging, Specialty Tape: The Legend of Katoey Island
 Best Packaging, Video Feature: Illusions
 Best Performance in a Gay Video: Michael Brawn, Kiss-Off
 Best Pro-Am Tape: Biff Malibu's Totally Nasty Home Videos #6
 Best Screenplay, Film: Michael Torino, The Secret Garden 1 & 2
 Best Screenplay, Gay Video: Stan Mitchell, Songs in the Key of Sex
 Best Screenplay, Video: Michael Ellis, Jack Stephan; The Party
 Best Sex Scene in a Gay Video: Erik Houston, Brett Ford, Scorcher
 Best Spanking Specialty Tape: Defiance: The Spanking Saga
 Best Specialty Tape — All Other Genres: The Legend of Katoey Island
 Best Supporting Performance in a Gay Video: Wes Daniels, Songs in the Key of Sex
 Best Video Editing: Gene Sixx, The Party
 Best Videography: Two Women
 Best Videography, Gay Video: Ellary Stag, Disconnected
 Top Renting Release of the Year: Chameleons
 Top Selling Release of the Year: Chameleons

Honorary AVN awards

Special Achievement Award 
 Paul Thomas and Vivid Video, for loyalty to the adult film genre

Hall of Fame 
AVN Hall of Fame inductees for 1993 were: Erica Boyer, David Christopher, Debi Diamond, Jim Holliday, Fred J. Lincoln, Richard Mailer, William Margold, Peter North, Loni Sanders, Jeff Stryker, Marc Wallice, Ona Zee

Multiple nominations and awards 
The following twelve movies received multiple awards:
 8 - The Party
 6 - Chameleons
 4 - Face Dance, Parts 1 & 2; Kiss-Off
 3 - Bonnie and Clyde, The Secret Garden 1 & 2, Songs in the Key of Sex, Two Women
 2 - Down Bi Law, The Legend of Katoey Island, Mindscape II, Realities 2

Presenters and performers 
The following individuals, in order of appearance, presented awards or performed musical numbers. The show's trophy girl was Shayla LaVeaux.

Presenters

Performers

Ceremony information 

Actor Randy West hosted the show for the second consecutive year. His co-host for the first half of the show was Porsche Lynn while Ona Zee co-hosted the last half. Randy West opened the show with a song, “We Put the X in Sex”, the lyrics of which contained names of several actors and actresses.

Several other people were involved with the production of the ceremony. The live show was produced by Gary Todd while musical direction was undertaken by Mark J. Miller. A VHS videotape of the show was also published and sold by VCA Pictures, which was produced and directed by S. Marco DiMercurio.

There were several new categories this year, including Female Performer of the Year, Male Performer of the Year, Best Gonzo Video and Best Amateur or Pro-Am Video series.

Chameleons was announced as both the top selling movie and the top renting movie of the year.

Critical reviews 

Hustler magazine was critical of the awards, pointing out the Best Marketing Campaign award went to a video that wasn't released in 1992, and adding, “No matter. The AVN show isn't about accuracy. The annual exercise is a tuxedo-clad circle-jerk from AVN to all its advertisers. The joke is watching so many smut peddlers and performers take it seriously.”

Cheri magazine was more charitable, calling the awards “the porn industry's biggest party of the year.”

See also 

 AVN Award for Best Actress
 AVN Award for Best Supporting Actress
 AVN Award for Male Foreign Performer of the Year
 AVN Award for Male Performer of the Year
 AVN Award for Female Foreign Performer of the Year
 AVN Female Performer of the Year Award
 List of members of the AVN Hall of Fame

Notes

 Randy Spears was announced as the winner of Best Supporting Actor—Film in VCA Pictures' VHS videotape of the awards show, and a clip featuring him in The Secret Garden is shown. Cheri magazine also reported Spears as the winner of this category. However, Adult Video News magazine reported that the category was won by Joey Silvera for his role in Face Dance, Parts 1 & 2. AVN has repeated this in its lists of past winners published online and in subsequent awards show official programs. AVN did not report whether an error was made at the show, so it may be an error in their publications.

References

Bibliography

External links 

 
 Adult Video News Awards  at the Internet Movie Database
 
 
 

AVN Awards
1992 film awards
AVN Awards 10
1993 in Nevada